De Pass, also spelled DePass or De Passe, is a surname. People with this surname include:

Eliot de Pass (1851–1937), English merchant
Alfred Aaron de Pass (1861–1952), South African businessman
Frank de Pass (1887–1914), English recipient of the Victoria Cross
Morris DePass (1895–1981), American Army officer
Suzanne de Passe (born 1946),  American television, music and film producer

See also
de Passe Jones Entertainment, American entertainment company
Linha de Passe, 2008 Brazilian drama film